Markus Pflanz (born 31 December 1975) is a German football manager.

Career

In 2018, Pflanz was appointed manager of German seventh tier side TSV Künzell. In 2022, he was appointed manager of Oostende in the Belgian top flight.

References

External links

 

1975 births
Living people
Belgian Pro League managers
Expatriate football managers in Belgium
German expatriate football managers
German expatriate sportspeople in Belgium
German football managers
K.V. Oostende managers